Steven Cowan (born 17 February 1963) is a Scottish former professional footballer.

Career
Born in Paisley and raised in East Kilbride, Cowan began his career with St Mirren, but followed Alex Ferguson to Aberdeen in 1979. Cowan was with Aberdeen for six seasons but was never a regular in what was a very strong team. He then moved to Hibernian, scoring three hat-tricks and 19 league goals in all during the 1985–86 season. He was the top goalscorer in Scotland during that season, with 28 goals in total.

Cowan only scored four league goals in 1986–87, however, and transferred to Motherwell. He then had a loan spell at Albion Rovers before moving to Irish football with Portadown. Cowan was very productive at Portadown, scoring 66 league goals in 87 games, and winning three major honours including the Irish League in 1990 and 1991 as well as the Irish Cup in 1991 where he scored his famous goal as Portadown completed a domestic double. He left Portadown in 1993, and had short stints with Linlithgow Rose, Ballymena United and Cliftonville before ending his playing career after the 1994–95 season.

Cowan now works in financial services and also as a match analyst for Radio Forth.

Honours 
Aberdeen
Scottish Premier League: 1984–85
Drybrough Cup: 1980

Hibernian
Scottish League Cup: Runner-Up 1985–86

Portadown
Irish League Champion: 1989–90; 1990–91
Irish Cup Winner: 1990–91
Runner-Up: 1989–90

Individual
Ulster Footballer of the Year: 1992–93

References

 Sources

External links
 
 Irish League Footballing Greats profile

1963 births
Aberdeen F.C. players
Albion Rovers F.C. players
Ballymena United F.C. players
Cliftonville F.C. players
Hibernian F.C. players
NIFL Premiership players
Scottish Junior Football Association players
Living people
Motherwell F.C. players
Footballers from Paisley, Renfrewshire
Portadown F.C. players
Scottish Football League players
Scottish footballers
St Mirren F.C. players
Ulster Footballers of the Year
Linlithgow Rose F.C. players
Association football forwards